Ablita is a genus of moths of the family Noctuidae.

Species
Ablita adin (Schaus, 1911)
Ablita grammalogica Dyar, 1914
Ablita nymphica Dyar, 1914

References
Natural History Museum Lepidoptera genus database

Hadeninae
Noctuoidea genera